"Yesterday's Hero" is a pop song by John Paul Young. The song was written by George Young and Harry Vanda and was released in February 1975 as the lead single from Young's debut studio album, Hero (1975).

The song became a worldwide hit, peaking at No. 8 in Australia, No. 1 in South Africa and No. 41 in the United States.

Overview 
"Yesterday's Hero" is a song about the fleeting nature of pop stardom. It drew on Vanda & Young's own experiences as former teen idols.[1][2][16]

The song gave Young his first top ten hit,[10] reaching No. 8 on the Australian singles chart[10] and staying at No. 1 on the Melbourne charts for six weeks before being replaced by Hush's "Boney Maroney". The single sold strongly in the United States, where it reached No. 44 on the Cash Box Top 100 in February 1976.[17]

One of the key factors in the Australian success of "Yesterday's Hero" was the film clip made to promote it, which enabled the song to be given heavy exposure on Countdown, which had just switched to its new one-hour Sunday evening format, following the official start of colour TV broadcasting on 1 March 1975.[2][18][19] Young's debut performance on Countdown had him miming "Yesterday's Hero" while dressed in a sailor's suit surrounded on an island stage with a studio audience of screaming teen girls.[20] He was dragged off the stage three times by audience members and the microphone cord was ripped out but the song continued uninterrupted.[20] ABC TV producer, Michael Shrimpton believes his show, Countdown, played a big part in making "Yesterday's Hero" and Young a teen pop success.[18]

Reception
In April 1975, Molly Meldrum wrote in his Listener In-TV column "Now, if this record is not a hit all over the Australia then I'll burn my Beatles collection".

Cash Box magazine said "Heavy guitar riffs compliment the wailing vocal of John Paul as he rocks and rolls. Catchy lyrics and raunchy beat will incense copy artists who didn't think of it first."

Track listing 
7" (AP-10688) / (Ariola 16631 AT)
Side A "Yesterday's Hero" - 3:43
Side B "The Next Time" - 3:30

Charts

Weekly charts

Year-end charts

Bay City Rollers versions
Bay City Rollers covered the song in 1975.

Charts

Other cover version
 Paul Nicholas (1979)
 Laki Pingvini (as "Ne, nisam tvoj heroj", 1984)
 Ignatius Jones (1992)

References

1975 singles
1975 songs
Songs written by Harry Vanda
Songs written by George Young (rock musician)
Song recordings produced by Harry Vanda
Song recordings produced by George Young (rock musician)
John Paul Young songs
Albert Productions singles
Ariola Records singles
Bay City Rollers songs
Paul Nicholas songs
Number-one singles in South Africa